Khurmal District is a district of the Halabja Governorate in Kurdistan Region, Iraq. Its capital is the city of Khurmal.

References

External links
 KRG(Kurdish)

Geography of Iraqi Kurdistan
Districts of Halabja Province